Hans Christian Adamson (July 20, 1890 – September 11, 1968) was a Danish-born American writer, who, along with Eddie Rickenbacker, survived adrift for 24 days in the Pacific Ocean in 1942.

Personal history
Adamson was born in Varde, Denmark.

Adrift at sea

In October 1942, Eddie Rickenbacker was sent on a tour of air bases in the Pacific Theater of Operations. After visiting several air and sea bases in Hawaii, Rickenbacker was provided an older B-17D Flying Fortress (s/n 40-3089) as transportation to the South Pacific. The bomber strayed hundreds of miles off course while on its way to a refueling stop on Canton Island and was forced to ditch in a remote and little-traveled part of the Central Pacific Ocean.

For 24 days, Rickenbacker, his friend and business partner Hans Christian Adamson (then an Army Captain), and the rest of the crewmen drifted in life rafts at sea. Rickenbacker was still suffering somewhat from his earlier airplane crash, and Capt. Adamson sustained serious injuries during the ditching. The other crewmen in the B-17 were hurt to varying degrees. The crewmen's food supply ran out after three days. They lived on sporadic rain water and food such as seagulls.

A US Navy patrol OS2U-3 Kingfisher float-plane spotted and rescued the survivors on November 13, off the coast of Nukufetau in Tuvalu. All were suffering from hyperthermia, sunburn, dehydration, and near-starvation.

Writing
After retiring from the US Air Force as a full colonel, Adamson wrote a number of radio drama scripts and books, including:

 
 
 
 
 
 
 , a non-fiction work later fictionalized and filmed as Hellcats of the Navy in 1957

References

External links
 
Death Notice, Eugene Register

1890 births
1968 deaths
American aviators
United States Army personnel of World War I
Danish emigrants to the United States
Survivors of aviation accidents or incidents
People from Varde Municipality
United States Army Air Forces officers
United States Army Air Forces personnel of World War II
Burials at Arlington National Cemetery
20th-century American male writers
United States Air Force colonels